Ford UK's Zephyr/Consul cars used a new family of engines. The Zephyr engine included both straight-4 and straight-6 OHV engines. Production began in 1951 and lasted through to 1966, when it was replaced by Ford's Essex V4 and Essex V6 engines.

Consul/Zephyr 4
This engine continued in the Mark III car, now called Zephyr.

Automobiles using the Consul engine:
 Allard Palm Beach
 Buckler DD2
 Ford Consul
 Ford Zephyr 4
 Paramount Ten
 Reliant Sabre

Zephyr 6
The straight-6 Zephyr engine was used widely. Displacement began at  when it shared the same bore and stroke as the  4-cylinder engine.

 AC Ace
 AC Greyhound
 Allard Palm Beach
 Britannia GT
 Fairthorpe Zeta
 Ford Zephyr
 Ford Zodiac
 Lea-Francis Lynx
 Reliant Sabre
 Reliant Scimitar

See also
 List of Ford engines

Zephyr
Straight-four engines
Straight-six engines
Gasoline engines by model